Ridgeland School District 122 is a school district headquartered in Oak Lawn, Illinois in the Chicago metropolitan area.

It serves sections of Oak Lawn and Bridgeview.

Schools
Simmons Middle School (Oak Lawn)
Elementary schools:
Columbus Manor Elementary School (Oak Lawn)
Harnew Elementary School (Oak Lawn)
Kolb Elementary School (Oak Lawn)
Lieb Elementary School (Bridgeview)

References

External links
 

School districts in Cook County, Illinois